Anthony Mary Claret, CMF (December 23, 1807 – October 24, 1870) was a Spanish Catholic archbishop and missionary, and was confessor of Isabella II of Spain. He founded the congregation of Missionary Sons of the Immaculate Heart of Mary, commonly called the Claretians.

In addition to the Claretians, which in the early 21st century had over 450 houses and 3100 members, with missions in five continents, Claret founded or drew up the rules of several communities of religious sisters. His zealous life and the wonders he wrought, both before and after his death, testified to his sanctity. Claret is the patron saint of weavers.

Life
Anthony Maria Claret i Clarà was born in Sallent, in the county of Bages in the Province of Barcelona, on December 23, 1807, the fifth of the eleven children of Juan and Josefa Claret. His father was a woollen manufacturer. As a child he enjoyed pilgrimages to the nearby Shrine of Our Lady of Fussimanya.

Claret received an elementary education in his native village, and at the age of twelve became a weaver. At the age of eighteen, he went to Barcelona to specialize in his trade as a Jacquard loom programmer, and remained there until he was 20 years old. Meanwhile, he devoted his spare time to study and became proficient in Latin, French and engraving.
 
Frightened that his love of programming was causing him to become obsessed and burned out, and recognizing a call to religious life, he left Barcelona. He wished to become a Carthusian monk but finally entered the diocesan seminary at Vic in 1829, and was ordained on June 13, 1835, on the feast of St. Anthony of Padua. He received a benefice in his native parish, where he continued to study theology until 1839; but as missionary work strongly appealed to him, he proceeded to Rome. There he entered the Jesuit novitiate but had to leave due to ill health.  He then returned to Spain and exercised his pastoral ministry in Viladrau and Girona, attracting notice through his efforts on behalf of the poor. In an area despoiled by the Carlist civil war, he added the practice of rustic medicine to his other endeavors.

Recalled by his superiors to Vic, Claret was sent as Apostolic Missionary throughout Catalonia which had suffered from French invasions. He travelled from one mission to the next on foot. An eloquent preacher fluent in the Catalan language, he drew people from miles around. After a lengthy time in the pulpit, he would spend long hours in the confessional. He was said to have had the gift of discernment of consciences. In 1848 Claret's life was threatened by anti-clerical enemies and he was sent to the Canary Islands where he gave retreats for 15 months. His missions were so well attended that he often preached from an improvised pulpit in the plaza before the church.

Claretians
On his return to Spain, he established the Congregation of the Missionary Sons of the Immaculate Heart of Mary (The Claretians) on July 16, 1849, the Feast of Our Lady of Mount Carmel, and founded the great religious library at Barcelona which was called "Librería Religiosa" (now "Librería Claret"). Pope Pius IX gave approval to the congregation on December 22, 1865.

Archbishop

Pope Pius IX, at the request of the Spanish crown (Queen-regnant Isabella II of Spain), appointed him Archbishop of Santiago de Cuba, in 1849. He was consecrated at Vic in October 1850. Before he embarked, he made three separate pilgrimages: to Our Lady of the Pillar, patroness of Spain; to the Virgin of Montserrat, patroness of Catalonia; and to Our Lady of Fussimanya, near his home village.

The Santiago seminary was reorganized, clerical discipline strengthened, and over 9,000 marriages validated within the first two years of his arrival. He erected a hospital and numerous schools. Three times he made a visitation of the entire diocese, giving local missions incessantly. Among his great initiatives were trade or vocational schools for disadvantaged children and credit unions for the use of the poor. He wrote books about rural spirituality and agricultural methods, which he himself tested first. On August 25, 1855, he founded the Religious of Mary Immaculate together with Maria Antonia Paris.  The congregation was considered as the first women religious institute in Cuba. He also visited jails and hospitals, defended the oppressed and denounced racism. His work stirred up opposition and at Holguín his cheek was stabbed by a would-be assassin, who was associated with freemasonry. Claret obtained a commutation of the assailant's death sentence to a term in prison.

Claret was an exceptional preacher with incredible charisms: witnesses said his body would become transfigured while preaching or in prayer, he would levitate up to six feet off the ground at times in front of credible witnesses, he stopped a series of earthquakes in Cuba by kneeling on the ground and placing his palms to the earth while uttering prayers, he could calm terrible storms by raising a hand to the sky and blessing the storm clouds, he experienced apparitions of both Jesus and Mary, and was even seen walking on water. In addition, a supernatural light that radiated from his body while he was saying Mass was seen by many. It was so intense at times that one witness said he saw the light radiate from his body behind the altar all the way to the sacristy. Queen Isabella of Spain even produced a written statement solemnly declaring that she had personally witnessed this phenomenon.

On September 3, 1859, Claret claimed he had heard Jesus tell him that there were three great evils that were descending upon mankind: the first was a series of enormous, horrifying wars; the second, the four powerful demons of pleasure, love of money, false reasoning and a will separated from God. Finally, in addition to a grievance he had with certain Christians who had left the church, Jesus told Claret that the third chastisement would be brought about by Communism, an unknown, fledgling movement that only had hundreds of followers at the time.

Two years after the September 3 warning, during benediction of the Blessed Sacrament in August 1861, Claret again said he was warned interiorly by Jesus that Communism was to be the great foe of humanity. The remedy, Jesus told him, would include devotion to the Blessed Sacrament (also known as the Eucharist) and the Rosary.

In February 1857, Claret was recalled to Spain by Queen Isabella II, who made him her confessor. He obtained permission to resign his Cuban see and was appointed to the titular see of Trajanopolis. His influence was now directed solely to help the poor and to propagate learning; he lived frugally and took up his residence in an Italian hospice. For nine years he was rector of the Escorial monastic school, where he established a scientific laboratory, a museum of natural history, a library, college and schools of music and languages. In 1868, a new revolution dethroned the queen and sent her with her family into exile. Claret's life was also in danger, so he accompanied her to France. This gave him the opportunity to preach the Gospel in Paris. He stayed with them for a while, then went to Rome where he was received by Pope Pius IX.

He continued his popular missions and distribution of  books wherever he went in accompanying the Spanish Court. When Isabella recognized the new, secular government of a united Italy, he left the Court and hastened to take his place by the side of the pope. At the latter's command, however, he returned to Madrid with faculties for absolving the queen from the censures she had incurred.

Last years
In 1869 he went to Rome to prepare for the First Vatican Council. Owing to failing health he withdrew to Prada de Conflent in the French Pyrenees, where he was still harassed by his Spanish enemies; shortly afterwards he retired to the Cistercian abbey at Fontfroide, Narbonne, southern France, where he died on October 24, 1870, aged 62.

His remains were buried in the Catalan city of Vic, in the County of Osona.

Works
Anthony Mary Claret wrote 144 books. By his sermons and writings he contributed greatly to bring about the revival of the Catalan language, although most of his works were published in Spanish, especially during his stay in Cuba and Madrid. His Autobiography of Anthony Mary Claret is an autobiography that, according to the introduction, was written from 1861 to 1862 at the command of Anthony's spiritual director, Joseph Xifré. The autobiography is divided into chapters. Chapter XVIII is about Anthony's "inner enlightenments." In this chapter, Anthony claims to have received private revelation. In section 694, he claims that on August 26, 1861, he experienced an Eucharistic miracle. In section 695, he claims that, the next day, he had a vision of Jesus speaking of the future.

His printed works number more than one hundred, including "La escala de Jacob"; "Máximas de moral la más pura"; "Avisos";
"Catecismo explicado con láminas"; "La llave de oro";
"Selectos panegíricos" (11 volumes); "Sermones de misión" (3 volumes); "Misión de la mujer"; "Vida de Sta. Mónica"; "La Virgen del Pilar y los Francmasones."

In addition to the Claretians, which in the early 21st century had over 450 houses and 3100 members, with missions in five continents, Archbishop Claret founded or drew up the rules of several communities of religious sisters.

Veneration
His zealous life and the wonders he wrought, both before and after his death, testified to his sanctity. Information was sought in 1887 and he was declared venerable by Pope Leo XIII in 1899. His relics were transferred to the mission house at Vic in 1897, at which time his heart was found incorrupt. His grave is visited by many pilgrims.

Anthony Mary Claret was beatified in Rome by Pope Pius XI on February 24, 1934. He was canonized 16 years later by Pope Pius XII on May 7, 1950. Pope John XXIII included him in the General Roman Calendar in 1960, and fixed his feast on October 23, where it remained for nine years until the 1969 revision of the calendar moved it to the day of his death, October 24, which had been the feast of Saint Raphael the Archangel since 1921.

Anthony Mary Claret is the patron saint of weavers.

Educational legacy
Many educational institutions ranging from kindergarten to undergraduate school are named after Claret and run by the Claretians in Europe, South America, Africa and Asia. They are located in Catalonia (Barcelona, Valls and Sabadell), rest of Spain (Madrid, Gran Canaria, Sevilla, and Valencia), Colombia (Cali), Dominican Republic (Santo Domingo), Peru (Trujillo, Huancayo, Arequipa and Lima), Argentina (Buenos Aires and Bahía Blanca), Venezuela (Caracas, Maracaibo and Mérida), Equatorial Guinea (Malabo), Chile (Temuco), Costa Rica (Heredia), the Philippines (Zamboanga City, Quezon City), India (Ziro), and Bangalore.

In popular culture
He is portrayed by Antonio Reyes in the 2022 film Slaves and Kings, produced by the Claretians and Stellarum Films, and directed by Pablo Moreno. The film is a re-release of the 2020 film Claret.

See also
Claretians
List of Catholic saints
Autobiography of Anthony Mary Claret

References

Sources

External links

Instituto Claret San Blas 1640, Villa General Mitre, Capital Federal, Ciudad de Buenos Aires, A-0380 
Catholic Encyclopedia: Congregations of the Heart of Mary
 "A Very Special Patron: Saint Anthony Mary Claret" article Catholicism.org

1807 births
1870 deaths
People from Bages
19th-century Roman Catholic archbishops in Cuba
Claretians
Spanish Roman Catholic missionaries
Founders of Catholic religious communities
Claretian bishops
Participants in the First Vatican Council
Roman Catholic archbishops of Havana
Catalan Roman Catholic saints
19th-century Christian saints
Canonizations by Pope Pius XII
Roman Catholic archbishops of Santiago de Cuba